This Stuff'll Kill Ya! is a 1971 film directed by Herschell Gordon Lewis and starring Tim Holt and Jeffrey Allen. It features Holt's final film appearance.

Plot
A con artist acts as a preacher to run his moonshine distillery in a small town in the Deep South and clashes with a number of locals and a federal agent bent on shutting his operation down.

Production
This Stuff'll Kill Ya! was filmed in Checotah and Oklahoma City, Oklahoma.

Critical reception
Writing for DVD Talk, critic David Cornelius described the film as "unyielding creepiness," and wrote that "[i]t also doesn't help that Allen's performance - which permeates almost every frame - is grating to no end, while the story absentmindedly stumbles around with no clear focus." Film review site Film Threat describes the film as "long, dull and boring" with "stilted dialogue and static direction." Critic Jeffrey Kauffman described the film as an "oddball entry," "patently silly," and "Uneven at best and hilariously inept at worst (in the Lewis tradition)."

See also
List of American films of 1971

References

External list

1971 films
1971 crime drama films
American crime drama films
1970s English-language films
Films directed by Herschell Gordon Lewis
1970s American films